Margarita Bertheau Odio (born in San José, Costa Rica on 13 May 1913; died in Escazú (canton) on 21 November 1975) was a Costa Rican painter and cultural promoter. The Costa Rican Art Museum states she is said to be known for "landscapes, portraits, watercolor figures, and her geometric, surrealistic and abstract work." She has been called the first female Watercolor painting artist of her country. She had independent views and was contemporary with the first wave of Costa Rican artists that included Dinora Bolandi, Lola Fernandez and Sonia Romero. These four are said to have taught fine art at the University of Costa Rica and to have created the second generation of Costa Rican women artists.

She worked with Francisco Amighetti on a mural called Agriculture . The mural was for the presidential palace and has been called both pastoral and shocking as it shows the peasants farming but in the distance others run as a person is shot.

References 

20th-century Costa Rican painters
Costa Rican women artists
People from San José, Costa Rica
Costa Rican people of Italian descent
Women watercolorists
1913 births
1975 deaths
Academic staff of the University of Costa Rica
20th-century women artists